Quintus Marcius Rex ( 2nd century BC) was a Roman politician of the Marcii Reges, a patrician family of gens Marcia, who claimed royal descent from the Roman King Ancus Marcius. He was a paternal great-grandfather of Julius Caesar.

He was appointed praetor peregrinus in 144 BC under the consulship of Servius Sulpicius Galba and Lucius Aurelius Cotta. The two major Roman aqueducts, Aqua Appia and Aqua Anio Vetus, were greatly damaged and many fraudulent misappropriations of their water reduced the flow.

The Senate commissioned Marcius to repair the channels of two aqueducts and stop the diversion. Additionally, he was given the task to build a bigger aqueduct. He was granted  sestertii for construction, and since his praetorship term expired before the aqueduct's completion, it was extended for a year.

The canals, named Aqua Marcia to honor Marcius, reached to the hill Capitolinus on arches, while secondary branches brought water to the hills Caelius and Aventinus.

In 143 BC, under the consulship of Appius Claudius Pulcher and Quintus Caecilius Metellus Macedonicus, the Decemvirs consulted the Sibylline Books and found that it was the Aqua Anio Vetus's water that led to the Capitolinus.  They reported their conclusions to the Senate. Three years later, in 140 BC, under the consulship of Quintus Servilius Caepio and Gaius Laelius Sapiens, this matter was again brought before the Senate. The decemvirs' opinion prevailed, and the aqueduct's water was rerouted to Capitolinus.

Regardless whether the initial change in the aqueduct was the result of ignorance, intention, or chance, the aqueduct was kept in Rome, because it was needed to support the city in its wars against the Italics.

See also 
 Marcia (gens)

References

Sources 
 Frontinus - De aquaeductu
 Pliny the Elder - Natural History
 Plutarch - Life of Coriolanus
 Smith, William - Dictionary of Greek and Roman Biography and Mythology

2nd-century BC Romans
Quintus